David Lawrence (December 25, 1888, in Philadelphia, Pennsylvania – February 11, 1973, in Sarasota, Florida) was a conservative newspaperman.

Early career
He attended Princeton University (Class of 1910).  While there, he was a student of Woodrow Wilson. In 1916, he became the Washington correspondent of the New York Evening Post.

After his re-election as U.S. President, President Woodrow Wilson fired Irish-American White House secretary (chief of staff) Joseph Patrick Tumulty in 1916 to placate anti-Catholic sentiment, particularly from his wife and his advisor, Colonel Edward M. House. Then, Lawrence successfully interceded on Tumulty's behalf to remain.

Political views
During the presidency of Franklin Roosevelt, David Lawrence criticised the New Deal in his 1934 book Beyond the New Deal. His observation of economic activity led him to distinguish between free enterprise and corporatism, and he wrote, "Theoretically, corporations are creations of the state."

He sharply criticised the use of the atomic bomb against Japan, comparing it to the gas chambers of Nazi concentration camps, and he maintained that the United States had become guilty and needed to apologize to the world.

Publisher

In 1926, Lawrence founded United States Daily, a weekly newspaper devoted to covering government. Seven years later, he shut it down to start United States News for an audience of community leaders, businessmen, and politicians. In 1948, United States News merged with Lawrence's two-year-old weekly magazine, World Report, to form the news magazine U.S. News & World Report. At the time of his death, the magazine had a circulation of two million.

Death
He died of an apparent heart attack at his Sarasota, Florida, home.

Awards
On April 22, 1970, David Lawrence was presented with the Presidential Medal of Freedom by President Richard Nixon.

Personal life
Lawrence married Ellanor (Campbell Hayes Daly) Lawrence on July 17, 1918, and they had three children, David Jr., Mark, Nancy. Etienne was a daughter from a previous marriage. Ellanor died June 13, 1969. To honor her memory, in 1971 David Lawrence gave Fairfax County, Virginia, the land that became Ellanor C. Lawrence Park in Chantilly.

References

External links
 David Lawrence Papers at the Seeley G. Mudd Manuscript Library, Princeton University
 David Lawrence: A Profile
 Short biography
 Magazine timeline
 The American Presidency Project - Remarks on Presenting the Presidential Medal of Freedom to Eight Journalists - April 22, 1970

American magazine founders
American magazine publishers (people)
1888 births
1973 deaths
Presidential Medal of Freedom recipients
Writers from Philadelphia
People from Sarasota, Florida